The German Military Mission in Romania was a mission led by lieutenant general Erick-Oskar Hansen, and sent from Nazi Germany to help Romania during World War II. German officers and aviators trained and supported the Romanian army from October 1940 to August 1944.

See also
 Germany–Romania relations
 Romania during World War II

References

Bibliography
 Alexandru Oșca, Gheorghe Nicolescu, Tratate, convenții militare și protocoale secrete. 1934-1939, Editura Vlasie, 1994, ISBN 973-96409-6-6
 Savu, Al. G., Dictatura regală, Editura Politicii, București, 1970, p. 389
 Relațiile militare româno-germane (1939-1944), Editura Europa Nova, București, 2000, p. 25.

Romania in World War II
German–Romania military relations